voco Orchard Singapore  is a voco hotel in located at Orchard Road, Singapore. It is the first voco branded hotel by InterContinental Hotels Group in Southeast Asia

History 
The construction of the Singapore Hilton was announced in The Straits Times on 1 November 1963, along with its sister hotel, the Kuala Lumpur Hilton. Singapore had joined as one of the states in the new nation of Malaysia only weeks before. The two hotels were financed by businessman Cho Jock Kim, head of Far East Publishers. The $18 million hotel was designed by local architects Booty Edwards & Partners. Completion was intended for 1965, but Singapore left Malaysia that year, and by November 1965, only the pilings of the structure had been completed.

Construction resumed in 1968 and the Far East Organization, owned by billionaire Ng Teng Fong, listed the hotel on the Stock Exchange of Malaysia and Singapore in August 1968, through its Far Eastern Hotels Development Ltd. subsidiary. A topping off ceremony was held on 23 September 1969. Interior design work was done by Dale Keller, of Pacific House (Asia) Limited and the hotel featured a huge 19-panel facade mural, sculpted by local artist Gerard Henderson and a 25-foot solid aluminum lobby mural by artist Seah Kim Joo. The partly-completed hotel opened 100 of its 448 rooms in March 1970.

The Singapore Hilton celebrated its grand opening on 30 January 1971, officiated by Minister for Foreign Affairs and Minister for Labour S. Rajaratnam. Hilton International operated as a separate business from Hilton in the US after 1964, and its properties were rebranded in 1979, with the hotel renamed the Hilton International Singapore. In 1980, the hotel was sold to billionaire Ong Beng Seng. Hilton re-acquired Hilton International in 2005 and the Hilton International branding was retired in 2006, when the hotel became the Hilton Singapore.

On 13 December 2015, the ceiling of the hotel entrance collapsed and debris fell into a car. 4 people were sent to hospital. According to the Building and Construction Authority, the building's structure remained intact and was not affected by the collapse of the false ceiling.

On 1 January 2022, the hotel was renamed voco Orchard Singapore.

Accommodation and facilities 

The hotel has 423 guest rooms, a rooftop swimming pool, fitness center and 2 treatment rooms, 11 meeting rooms for 18-550 people and 2 business centres. Situated in the heart of Orchard Road- a popular entertainment and shopping district, the hotel is close to both ION Orchard and Takashimaya shopping centers. This hotel is only 20 minutes from Singapore Changi Airport and close to Singapore's popular attractions.

Access 
The hotel is linked to Four Seasons Hotel via a link bridge.

See also 
 Iggy's, a fine dining restaurant within the hotel

References 

Hotels in Singapore
Orchard Road
Hotels established in 1970
Hotel buildings completed in 1970
Singaporean companies established in 1970
20th-century architecture in Singapore